Blake of Scotland Yard is a 1937 Victory Pictures American film serial directed by Robert F. Hill. The serial was also edited down into a feature film version.

Plot
Sir James Blake, a leading figure in crime fighting, has retired from Scotland Yard in order to assist his niece Hope and her friend Jerry in developing an apparatus they have invented. Sir James believes that their invention has the potential to prevent wars, and plans to donate it to the League of Nations. However, a gang of criminals led by the elusive "Scorpion" steals the device, and Blake and his associates must recover the invention and determine the true identity of the "Scorpion".

Cast
 Ralph Byrd as Jerry Sheehan
 Herbert Rawlinson as Sir James Blake
 Joan Barclay as Hope Mason
 Lloyd Hughes as Dr. Marshall
 Dickie Jones as Bobby Mason
 Lucille Lund as The Duchess, a Gang Moll
 Nick Stuart as Julot, Male Apache Dancer
 Sam Flint as Chief Inspector Henderson
 Gail Newbury as Mimi, policewoman posing as dancer
 Jimmy Aubrey as Baron Polinka
 Theodore Lorch as Daggett, the butler
 George DeNormand as Gang Member posing as Newshawker
 Bob Terry as Peyton, lead thug
 William Farrel as Count Basil Zagaloff
 Frank Wayne as Charles
 Dick Curtis as Nicky, a Gang Member

External links

1937 films
1930s crime films
1930s science fiction films
American black-and-white films
Films directed by Robert F. Hill
Films set in London
Film serials
Films produced by Sam Katzman
American crime films
1930s English-language films
1930s American films